Pirenidae is a family of chalcidoid wasps. It was formerly treated as a subfamily within the family Pteromalidae but is now recognized as a distinct family.

Genera
The subfamilies and genera of Pirenidae include the following:
Subfamily Cecidellinae
Cecidellis
Subfamily Eriaporinae
Eunotiscus
Promuscidea
Subfamily Euryischiinae
Euryischia
Euryischomyia
Myiocnema
Subfamily Pireninae
Ecrizotomorpha
Keesia
Lasallea
Macroglenes
Papuaglenes
Petipirene
Pirene
Velepirene
Watshamia
Zebe
Subfamily Tridyminae
Calyconotiscus
Ecrizotes
Epiterobia
Gastrancistrus
Melancistrus
Oxyglypta
Premiscogaster
Sirovena
Spathopus
Spinancistrus
Tridymus

References

Further reading

External links

 

Chalcidoidea

Hymenoptera families